The Journal of Pipeline Systems Engineering and Practice is a peer-reviewed scientific journal published by the American Society of Civil Engineers that covers topics on pipeline systems, from planning, construction, to safety and maintenance. This journal has a lot of practical coverage and a good resource for practicing engineers looking for environmental and sustainable pipeline information to address water distribution, wastewater systems, storm sewers and more.

Abstracting and indexing
The journal is abstracted and indexed in Ei Compendex, ProQuest databases, Civil Engineering Database, Inspec, Science Citation Index Expanded, Scopus, and EBSCO databases.

References

External links

Engineering journals
American Society of Civil Engineers academic journals
Publications established in 2010